Ági Mészáros (born Ágnes Éberli; 24 May 1914 – 8 March 1989) was a Hungarian film actress. She appeared in 27 films between 1940 and 1977. Her daughter Ági Voith is also an actress.

Selected filmography
 Treasured Earth (1948)
 Mickey Magnate (1949)
 Kiskrajcár (1953)
 Twenty Hours (1965)
 Budapest Tales (1976)

References

External links

1914 births
1989 deaths
Hungarian film actresses
Actresses from Budapest
20th-century Hungarian actresses